James A. Corr (born 25 January 1934) is a former Irish Fine Gael politician who served as Lord Mayor of Cork from 1979 to 1980 and 1996 to 1997. He served as a Teachta Dála (TD) for the Cork South-Central from February 1982 to November 1982.

Corr was a member of Cork City Council from 1973 to 2014. He was first co-opted to the council (then called Cork Corporation) in 1973, and elected at the 1974 local elections. He was Lord Mayor of Cork in 1979 and 1996.

When the five-seat Cork South-Central constituency was created in 1980, Fine Gael's support was sufficient for two seats. Peter Barry was the party's senior TD; Corr had a rivalry with Hugh Coveney for the second Fine Gael seat. Coveney narrowly beat Corr at the 1981 general election, but Corr won by a larger margin in February 1982. Becoming disillusioned with Dáil politics, Corr stood aside in November 1982, with Coveney regaining the seat. Corr was to stand as a third Fine Gael candidate at the 1987 general election, but stood aside to avoid splitting the Fine Gael vote, though Coveney lost his seat in any event. Corr was unsuccessful at the 1989 and 1992 general elections.

Corr was unhappy that John Cushnahan was selected ahead of him as Fine Gael candidate in Munster at the 1989 European Parliament election. Corr stood unsuccessfully in Munster at the 1999 European Parliament election.

Corr taught geography, and wrote a school textbook in 1972. He spent six years working in Africa. He was a trade union activist, and considered on the left wing of Fine Gael in the early 1980s. He was appointed to the Board of Bord Gáis in 1997. He has been chairman of the advisory board of European Cities Against Drugs since 2002.

References

 

1934 births
Living people
Fine Gael TDs
Geography teachers
Heads of schools in Ireland
Irish schoolteachers
Local councillors in Cork (city)
Lord Mayors of Cork
Members of the 23rd Dáil